Irene Siragusa (born 23 June 1993) is an Italian sprinter, who participated at the 2015, 2017 and 2019 World Athletics Championships. She won two individual medals at the 2017 Summer Universiade. She competed at the 2020 Summer Olympics, in 4 × 100 m relay.

Biography
She competed in the 4 × 100 metres relay at the 2015 World Championships in Athletics in Beijing and in 200 metres at the 2017 World Championships in Athletics in London. Before turning to athletics, she practiced artistic roller skating. She won five times (four outdoor and one indoor) the national championships at individual senior level.

National records
 4 × 100 m relay: 42.90 (Doha, Qatar, 4 October 2019), she ran final leg in the team with Johanelis Herrera, Gloria Hooper, Anna Bongiorni – current holder

Personal bests
Outdoor
100 metres: 11.21 (+1.1 m/s; Orvieto, 17 June 2018)
200 metres: 22.96 (–1.4 m/s; Taipei, 26 August 2017)
Indoor
60 metres: 7.32 (Ancona, 18 February 2018)

Achievements

National titles
Italian Athletics Championships
100 metres: 2014, 2017
200 metres: 2014, 2018
Italian Athletics Indoor Championships
60 metres: 2020

See also
 2020 in 100 metres
 Italian all-time lists – 100 metres
 Italian all-time lists – 200 metres
 Italian all-time lists – 4 × 100 metres relay

References

External links
 

1993 births
Living people
People from Poggibonsi
Italian female sprinters
Athletics competitors of Gruppo Sportivo Esercito
Universiade medalists in athletics (track and field)
Mediterranean Games bronze medalists for Italy
Mediterranean Games medalists in athletics
Athletes (track and field) at the 2018 Mediterranean Games
Universiade gold medalists for Italy
Universiade silver medalists for Italy
World Athletics Championships athletes for Italy
Medalists at the 2017 Summer Universiade
Athletes (track and field) at the 2020 Summer Olympics
Olympic athletes of Italy
Sportspeople from the Province of Siena
20th-century Italian women
21st-century Italian women
Athletes (track and field) at the 2022 Mediterranean Games